Alcova Dam (National ID # WY01290) is a  tall zoned earthfill dam in central Wyoming, built in 1935-38 on the North Platte River and operated by the U.S. Bureau of Reclamation for water storage and hydroelectric power generation. The dam was built as part of the Kendrick Project, formerly the Casper-Alcova Project, whose central features are Alcova and Seminoe dams.

Alcova Powerplant comprises two generating units, each  18 MW.

History

Alcova Canyon was first surveyed for potential damsites in 1903. In 1921 a dam was proposed at Alcova to divert water to Casper, irrigating . The project was authorized in 1933, with $15,000,000 allocated by 1936. Initially titled the Casper-Alcova Project, the effort was renamed the Kendrick Project in 1937 to honor Wyoming senator John B. Kendrick. Work on a diversion tunnel began in 1933. Work on the dam started in 1935, carried out by a joint venture of W.E. Callahan Construction of Dallas, Texas, and Gunther and Shirley of Los Angeles, California. Earthfill placement started in 1936.and was completed in  1937. The reservoir was filled in 1938, with final completion of the dam on May 8, 1938. The powerplant was not started until 1952, completed three years later.

References

External links

 Alcova Dam at the Bureau of Reclamation
 Alcova Powerplant at the Bureau of Reclamation
 Kendrick Project at the Bureau of Reclamation

Dams in Wyoming
Buildings and structures in Natrona County, Wyoming
United States Bureau of Reclamation dams
Dams completed in 1938
Dams on the North Platte River
Hydroelectric power plants in Wyoming